Hasta el viento tiene miedo, known in English as Even the Wind is Afraid and The Wind of Fear,  is a 1968 (1967 according to the ITESM) Mexican gothic supernatural horror film, written and directed by Carlos Enrique Taboada. It is considered a cult movie in México and has been credited as having revitalized the Mexican horror genre.

A remake was released in 2007.

Plot
The film is about a group of students in an exclusive college for women, led by Claudia (Alicia Bonet) who decide to investigate a local tower that has figured prominently in disturbing and recurring dreams Claudia has been having. The dream also features a hanged woman's body. They are suspended from school for their antics, but Claudia learns from one of the female staff members that the person in the dream is a student who killed herself years before, and that the teacher has seen their ghost.

Andrea, the young woman who committed suicide in the tower, haunts the women's college seeking revenge for her terrible tragedy.  When Andrea attended the college she learned that her mother was gravely ill and wished to be excused from school to visit her dying mother.  When Bernarda, the principal, forbade her to leave, Andrea became distraught and overcome with grief. In a manic episode she decided to kill herself in the tower after the news of their mother's death.

Andrea now swears revenge and won't rest until Bernarda pays for what she did to her.  One windy night, Andrea beckons Claudia to climb the stairs to the tower. Bernarda follows her and attempts to stop her. When Bernarda reaches the top of the stairs where Andrea killed herself, Bernarda encounters Andrea. Bernarda, terrified by fear,  can't defend herself from Andrea and is fatally attacked by her.

Some time after the events of that stormy night, Claudia is set to go home and the new headmistress assures her that all is well in the college. As she walks to the school's main gate, she stares at the tower with fear, but the school's gardener tells her that Andrea is now resting in peace and is gone, this time for good.

Cast
 Marga López as Bernarda, the principal
 Maricruz Olivier as Lucía, the vice principal
 Alicia Bonet as Claudia
 Norma Lazareno as Kitty
 Renata Saydel as Ivette
 Elizabeth Dupeyrón as Josefina
 Rita Sabre Marroquín as Silvia
 Irma Castillón as Marina
 Rafael Llamas as Diego
 Sadi Dupeyrón (credited as Saidi Dupeyron) as Armando
 Pamela Susan Hall as Andrea, the ghost
 Enrique García Álvarez (credited Enrique Garcia) as Doctor Oliver 
 Lourdes Baledón as Verónica

Release 
Hasta el viento tiene miedo was first released to theaters in Mexico in 1968. It was released to the United States in Blu-ray format in 2020.

Reception
Vulture listed the movie as one of their recommendations for Mexican horror, writing that "What we hear in the tension built through the ambience, the eponymous wind in particular, rings more affecting than what’s actually shown onscreen." ComicsBeat praised the film for its acting, character development, and ambiance.

Marca covered Hasta el viento tiene miedo for the film's 50th anniversary in 2018, noting its cult status. They spoke with actress Norma Lazareno, who stated that the movie was ahead of its time. She further commented that the director conspired with technicians to play tricks on the actresses, so that they would become unnerved during filming, which she credits as enhancing the movie's tension and fear factor.

Remake 
A remake, also titled Hasta el viento tiene miedo, was released in 2007. It was directed by Gustavo Moheno and starred Martha Higareda as the film's protagonist, who is committed after a suicide attempt. The remake received negative critical reception while also receiving a more favorable reaction from the general public.

See also
List of ghost films

References

External links

 
ITESM Review

1968 films
1968 horror films
Mexican supernatural horror films
Films directed by Carlos Enrique Taboada
1960s Mexican films